Manganese oxalate is a chemical compound, a salt of manganese and oxalic acid with the chemical formula . The compound creates light pink crystals, does not dissolve in water, and forms crystalline hydrates. It occurs naturally as the mineral Lindbergite.

Synthesis
Exchange reaction between sodium oxalate and manganese chloride:

Physical properties
Manganese oxalate forms light pink crystals.

It does not dissolve in water, p Ksp= 6.8.

Forms crystalline hydrates of the composition MnCO•n HO, where n = 2 and 3.

Crystalline hydrate of the composition MnCO•2HO forms light pink crystals of the orthorhombic system, space group P212121, cell parameters a = 0.6262 nm, b = 1.3585 nm, c = 0.6091 nm, Z = 4, melts in its own crystallization water at 100°C.

Chemical properties
Decomposes on heating:

Application
Manganese oxalate is used as an auxiliary siccative.

See also

References

Manganese compounds
Oxalates